The Zanzibar Archipelago consists of several islands lying off the coast of East Africa south of the Somali sea. The archipelago is also known as the Spice Islands. There are four main islands, three primary islands with human populations, a fourth coral island that serves as an essential breeding ground for seabirds, plus a number of smaller islets that surround them and an isolated tiny islet.

Most of the archipelago belongs to the Zanzibar semi-autonomous region of Tanzania, while Mafia Island and its associated islets are parts of the Pwani Region on the mainland.

List of islands

Main islands

Unguja Island – the largest island, colloquially referred to as Zanzibar, has 896,721 inhabitants
Pemba Island – the second-largest island with 406,808 inhabitants
Latham Island (also called "Fungu Kizimkazi") – tiny and uninhabited
Mafia Island – 46,850 inhabitants

Surrounding Unguja Island
Bawe Island
Changuu Island
Chapwani Island
Chumbe Island
Daloni Island
Kwale Island
Miwi Island
Mnemba Island – settled
Murogo Sand Banks
Nyange Island
Pange Island
Popo Island
Pungume Island
Sume Island
Tele Island
Tumbatu Island – settled
Ukombe Island
Uzi Island – settled
Vundwe Island

Surrounding Pemba Island
Fundo Island – settled
Funzi Island
Jombe Island
Kashani Island
Kisiwa Hamisi
Kisiwa Kamata
Kisiwa Mbali
Kisiwa N´gombe
Kojani Island – settled
Kokota Island – settled
Kuji Island
Kwata Islet
Makoongwe Island – settled
Matumbi Makubwa Island
Matumbini Island
Misali Island
Njao Island
Panani Island
Panza Island – settled
Shamiani Island – settled
Sumtama Island
Uvinje Island – settled
Vikunguni Island

See also 
 Mainland Tanzania

References

Further reading 
 Finke, J. (2006) The Rough Guide to Zanzibar (2nd edition). New York: Rough Guides.

External links

 Zanzibar.net

 
Divided regions
Archipelagoes of the Indian Ocean
Archipelagoes of Tanzania
 
Coastal islands of Tanzania
Northern Zanzibar–Inhambane coastal forest mosaic